Acleris retrusa is a species of moth of the family Tortricidae. It is found in Mexico (Veracruz, Jalapa).

The wingspan is about 16 mm. The ground colour of the forewings is brownish with a slight ferruginous admixture and ochreous cream beyond the middle. The pattern is diffuse and browner than the ground colour. The hindwings are brownish, but paler towards the base.

The larvae feed on Rubus species.

References

Moths described in 1993
retrusa
Moths of Central America